ARA Guerrico (P-32) is a  of the Argentine Navy. She is the first vessel to be named after Rear Admiral Martín Guerrico who fought in the 19th century Paraguayan War.

She is currently based at Mar del Plata and conducts fishery patrol duties in the Argentine exclusive economic zone where she has captured several trawlers in recent years. According to reports in November 2012 the Drummond class "hardly sail because of lack of resources for operational expenses". As of 2020, she was reported in reserve.

Service history 
Guerrico was built in 1977 in France for the South African Navy to be named SAS Transvaal but was embargoed at the last minute by United Nations Security Council Resolution 418. She was sold to Argentina instead and delivered on 9 November 1978. She was rushed into service and deployed a month later for the Operation Soberanía against Chile.

In 1982 she served in the Falklands War most notably in the Invasion of South Georgia where she was damaged by Royal Marines weapon fire which led to her spending three days in dry dock for repairs before rejoining the fleet as part of Task Group 79.4, alongside her sister ships operating to the north of the islands. She carried the P-2 pennant number until the introduction of the s in 1985 when she became P-32.

In 1994, Guerrico and her sisters participated in Operation Uphold Democracy, the United Nations blockade of Haiti. During this time, she was based at Roosevelt Roads Naval Station in Puerto Rico.

She has also served as support ship of the Buenos Aires-Rio de Janeiro tall ships races.

References 
Portions based on a translation from Spanish Wikipedia.

Further reading 
 Guia de los buques de la Armada Argentina 2005–2006. Ignacio Amendolara Bourdette, Editor n/a. (Spanish/English text)

External links 
 Argentine Navy official site, specifications and brief history (in Spanish)

Drummond-class corvettes
Ships built in France
1978 ships
Corvettes of Argentina
Corvettes of the Cold War